Krenek may refer to:

Ernst Krenek (1900–1991), Austrian and American composer
Křenek (Prague-East District)